Acritus tuberisternus, is a species of clown beetle found in Indo-Pacific regional countries such as Japan, Mauritius, Sri Lanka, India, Myanmar, Vietnam, Laos, Malaysia, Taiwan.

References 

Histeridae
Insects of Sri Lanka
Insects described in 1932